The Virxe da Barca sanctuary is a church located in Muxía, Spain. It was destroyed by a fire that was started by lightning on 25 December 2013.

History 
The sanctuary was originally a pre-Christian Celtic shrine and sacred spot. This part of Spain was resistant to conversion to Christianity, and was only converted in the 12th century. The Christians built a hermitage on this location at first, and later the present church in the 17th century.

Gallery

See also 
 List of destroyed heritage

References

External links 

 El Santuario de la Virgen de la Barca
 Image of interior, after fire

Churches in Spain
Destroyed churches
Buildings and structures demolished in 2013